The abbreviation DFV can refer to:

 Cosworth DFV, a Formula One racing engine
 DeepFuckingValue or Keith Gill (born 1986), an American financial analyst known for his posts on the subreddit r/wallstreetbets
 Dependencias Federales de Venezuela, the designation of most of the island dependencies of Venezuela
 Deutscher Frisbeesport-Verband, the association of frisbee players and teams in Germany
 Deutscher Fußball-Verband (East German Football Federation)